Statistics of Mestaruussarja in the 1985 season.

Overview
It was contested by 12 teams, and HJK Helsinki won the championship.

Preliminary stage

Table

Results

Championship Playoffs

Semifinals

|}

For Third Place

|}

Finals

|}

See also
Ykkönen (Tier 2)

References
Finland - List of final tables (RSSSF)

Mestaruussarja seasons
Fin
Fin
1